Her Name Is Calla were an English post-rock band based in the English cities of Leicester and Leeds, England.

History
After playing live throughout the United Kingdom to much critical acclaim, touring with iLiKETRAiNS and The Twilight Sad, Cult of Luna, Maybeshewill and Sólstafir, they released their debut album, The Heritage, in 2008, which was also positively acclaimed, and was followed by a well-received headlining tour. The album lasts over 50 minutes, despite only containing six tracks.

In February 2009, they announced their arrival on the German label, Denovali Records. Denovali re-released The Heritage on vinyl in late 2009.

The band released The Quiet Lamb, containing 12 tracks and lasting over 75 minutes, on 8 November 2010. NME gave it a score of 8/10, describing it as "massive, pastorally apocalyptic music". The Quiet Lamb is ranked the 12th best Post-rock album of all time in a poll of fans and reviewers with a critic's score of 83.

In 2014 after a turbulent hiatus, the band returned with their reflective third studio album, Navigator, which was supported by two UK tours and two European tours and single Ragman Roll. While the response to the Navigator was viewed positively by critics, it lacked the wider appeal witnessed with its predecessor.

In 2015, celebrating a decade of the playing together, the band released a short documentary entitled A Wave of Endorphins; a title inspired by the popular track "Pour More Oil" which appeared on The Quiet Lamb.

Lead vocalist Tom Morris has released music as a solo artist under the name T E Morris, as does multi-instrumentalist Adam Weikert as 'Weikie'.

In January 2019, the band announced break up and the final show took place on 4 May in London. Their final album, Animal Choir was released the same day to critical acclaim.

During ArcTanGent Festival 2022 near Bristol, the band played a one off reunion show on Saturday, 20 August.

Discography

Studio albums
 The Heritage (2008)
CD album - limited to 500 copies, Gizeh Records (1/06/08)
Handpackaged cassette - limited to 20 copies. Personalized introduction and packaging with hand typed lyric booklets. Also included extra songs) (1/06/08)
Vinyl Pressing - Limited to 500 copies 100 copies clear w/ violet haze, 200 copies black and 200 copies clear w/ violet mix ) Denovali Records (17/09/09)
 The Quiet Lamb (2010), Denovali Records (CD, CD in wooden presentation box, 2x12" vinyl in a triple gatefold. Available as picture disk, ultraclear or black vinyl)
2nd CD press, Gizeh Records / Denovali Records (17/09/09)
 Navigator (2014)
 A Wave Of Endorphins OST (2015)
 Animal Choir (2019)

EPs
The dead rift (300 10" vinyl with download) Function Records (June 2018)
Maw (300 10" vinyl with download) Denovali Records (April 2011)
Live at Denovali Swingfest 2010 - Three track digital download (Given away as free Christmas download in 2010)
 Long Grass - limited edition - 10"+CD (100 copies on clear vinyl and black haze, 200 copies on black); CD version (200 copies in wooden box) (early Feb 2010)

Singles
 "Swan" Digital only (11/11/2018)
 "Kaleidoscoping" 7" split with Deadwall (500 copies) Come play with me (25/11/2016)
 "Ragman roll" 7" (500 copies) Function records (10/10/2012)
 "A Moment of Clarity" 7" (500 copies) Gizeh Records (10/9/07)
 "Condor and River" CDR (250 copies) Loom (26/3/07)
 "Hideous Box" CDR (500 copies) Self released (2006)
 "The White and the Skin" CDR (unknown amount) Self released (2005)

Demos
 Blueprints: Augustus, Will You Build Again? CDR Self released (2004)
 The Cracked Wooden Hands of the Master Craftsman CDR Self released (2004)
 Paraplegia CDR Self released (2004)

Splits
 Maybeshewill / Her Name is Calla Split 12" Field Records (500 copies) (03/11/08)

Other
 A Blood Promise DVD/CD (300 copies) Gizeh Records (2/03/09)

Band members
 Thom Corah - Synthesizer, Keyboards, Trombone
 Anja Madhvani - Violin, Vocals, Keyboards
 Tom Morris - Vocals, Guitar, Keyboards, Banjo
 Adam Weikert - Drums, Banjo, Keyboards, Mandolin, Double Bass, Theremin, Vocals
 Tiernan Welch - Bass, Vocals

See also
List of post-rock bands

References

External links

English post-rock groups
Musical groups from Leicester